Gitane is an album by American jazz bassist Charlie Haden and French gypsy jazz guitarist Christian Escoudé that was released in 1979. Most of the album's compositions were written by guitarist Django Reinhardt.

Reception 
The Allmusic review by Brian Olewnick gave the album three stars, stating, "A warm, unhurried session, one that Haden fans will enjoy for both his prominence and creativity as well as for Escoude's carefully considered contributions".

Track listing

Personnel 
 Charlie Haden – double bass
 Christian Escoudé – guitar

References 

Charlie Haden albums
1979 albums
Instrumental duet albums